Frederic H. "Fred" Burrall (born September 19, 1935) was an American politician in the state of Florida.

Burrall was born in Green Bay, Wisconsin and attended the University of Wisconsin–Madison, Florida State University, and the University of Florida. He was a veteran of USAF, journalist, newspaper editor, real estate agent, park ranger. He served in the Florida House of Representatives for the 71st district from 1974 to 1984, as a Republican.

References

Living people
1935 births
Republican Party members of the Florida House of Representatives
Politicians from Green Bay, Wisconsin
University of Florida alumni
Florida State University alumni
University of Wisconsin–Madison alumni
Businesspeople from Florida